Albert Charles Scott (1872-1969) was a British Royal Navy officer during the First World War.

Albert Scott may also refer to:

Albert Scott, husband of Marian Marsh
Albert Scott (bodybuilder), ; see Papua New Guinea at the 2011 Pacific Games
Albert Scott, candidate for Warrington North

See also
Bert Scott (disambiguation)
Al Scott (disambiguation)